Chakri Vakilan, is a village in Gujar Khan Tehsil, Rawalpindi District, Pakistan. The village contains five shrines including the Sufi saint Baba Syed Sahib Subhan.

Kheengar Bhatti, Gakhar Rajpoot, Kalyal Bhatti Rajpoot, Arain and Syeds are the main castes living in the village.
Gulyana, Cheena, Mardyal, Patt, and Dhoke Khokar are other villages located in the neighbourhood of Chakri Vakilan.

Etymology
So together the words mean "a panchiat, or jury, of Lords".

References

Villages in Gujar Khan Tehsil